James David Lee Nicholson (31 January 1938 – 8 January 1967) was a British rower. He competed in the men's coxless pair event at the 1964 Summer Olympics. He represented Britain in the inaugural 1962 World Rowing Championships with Stewart Farquharson in the coxless pairs, in which they won the B final.

He also represented England and won a gold medal in the coxless pair with Stewart Farquharson, at the 1962 British Empire and Commonwealth Games in Perth, Western Australia. They both rowed for the University of London Boat Club at the time.

References

1938 births
1967 deaths
British male rowers
Olympic rowers of Great Britain
Rowers at the 1964 Summer Olympics
Sportspeople from Scarborough, North Yorkshire
Commonwealth Games medallists in rowing
Rowers at the 1962 British Empire and Commonwealth Games
Commonwealth Games gold medallists for England
Medallists at the 1962 British Empire and Commonwealth Games